Long Geng Airport  is located in Long Geng, Malaysia. There are no scheduled flights at this airport.

See also
 List of airports in Malaysia

References

Airports in Sarawak